Yisroel Reisman is an American rabbi and posek of Orthodox and Haredi Judaism who resides in Brooklyn, New York.

Career
Reisman is one of the roshei yeshiva (deans) at Yeshiva Torah Vodaas, where he received semikhah (rabbinical ordination). He is the rabbi of the summer camp network run by Agudath Israel of America. Reisman is the author of several books on halakha (Jewish law) and Tanach (the Jewish bible).

Views
Reisman believes that the future of the Jewish people is in Israel, and that the Jews who remain in the diaspora should support Torah study there.

References 

21st-century American rabbis
Authors of books on Jewish law
Torah Vodaath rosh yeshivas
Writers from Brooklyn
Living people
Year of birth missing (living people)